The Werewolf is a 1913 silent film short directed by Henry MacRae. The film is about a navajo woman becoming a timberwolf.

Plot 
Kee-On-Ee, a Navajo woman, becomes a witch after erroneously believing that her husband has abandoned her. She teaches the same skills to her daughter Watuma, who transforms into a wolf to carry out vengeance against the invading white settlers. Then, 100 years after Watuma's death, she returns from the dead to kill again. According to film historian Kelly Robinson, the film contains supernatural elements beyond mere lycanthropy such as witchcraft and reincarnation.

Production
Film historian Gary Don Rhodes stated that The Werewolf, written by  Ruth Ann Baldwin drew upon folktale traditions as well as the popularity of "Indian" films in early cinema. Baldwin was a former newspaper reporter, who worked as a screenwriter, editor and director at Universal in the 1910s. It was directed by Henry MacRae who had made over 130 films for Universal, including early sound film such as Tarzan the Tiger (1929) and Flash Gordon (1936). Lewis directed other Indigenous-themed films such as The Bronze Bride (1917).

The film starred Phyllis Gordon as Watuma, Clarence Burton as Ezra Vance, Marie Walcamp as a young Kee-On-Ee, Lule Warrenton as Kee-On-Ee and William Clifford as Jack Ford.

Release and reception
It was released on December 13, 1913. As of 2020, The Werewolf is a lost film as it was destroyed in a 1924 fire at Universal Studios.

From contemporary reviews, Motion Picture World found that "to those who care for much shooting and massacre, the picture will have appeal." while Motion Picture News declared the film to be "absolutely the most asinine affair ever produced [...] If this were a fairy story, it would be laughed at."

Craig Ian Mann wrote that The Werewolf was the first known werewolf film on record. In the early film cycle, at least two other films followed involving lycanthropy, including The Legend of the Phantom Tribe (1914) which was also written by Baldwin, directed by MacRae, and starring Clifford for 101 Bison. The other was The White Wolf (1914), which also involved an "Indian" theme with someone's spirit embodied within a wolf.

See also 
List of lost films

References

Sources

External links 

 

1913 films
American black-and-white films
American silent short films
Films about Native Americans
Films directed by Henry MacRae
American werewolf films
Lost American films
Films based on short fiction
1913 lost films
1910s American films